The 1986–87 Navy Midshipmen men's basketball team represented the United States Naval Academy during the 1986–87 NCAA Division I men's basketball season. The Midshipmen were led by first-year head coach Pete Herrmann, and played their home games at Halsey Field House in Annapolis, Maryland as members of the Colonial Athletic Association.

Roster

Schedule and results

|-
!colspan=9 style=| Non-conference regular season

|-
!colspan=9 style=| CAA regular season

|-
!colspan=9 style=| CAA tournament

|-
!colspan=9 style=| NCAA tournament

Source

Rankings

Awards and honors
 David Robinson – Naismith College Player of the Year, USBWA College Player of the Year, John R. Wooden Award, AP Player of the Year, Adolph Rupp Trophy, NABC Player of the Year, Sporting News Player of the Year, CAA Player of the Year (3), National leader in blocked shots per game (4.5)

Team players drafted into the NBA

References

Navy Midshipmen
Navy
Navy Midshipmen men's basketball seasons
Navy
Navy